Karbala was a town of ancient Cappadocia, inhabited in Byzantine times. It is the birthplace of Gregory of Nazianzus.

Its site is located near Güzelyurt, Asiatic Turkey.

References

Populated places in ancient Cappadocia
Former populated places in Turkey
Populated places of the Byzantine Empire
History of Aksaray Province